Philippe Vallois (born 27 August 1948 in Bordeaux, France) is an openly gay screenwriter and director whose film Johan (1976) was selected for the Cannes Film Festival.

Filmography

References

2. “Choreographing Homosexual Desire in Philippe Vallois’ Johan.” Camera Obscura 28.3/83 
(December 2013): 124-57.

External links

1948 births
Living people
French film directors
French male screenwriters
French screenwriters
LGBT film directors
French LGBT screenwriters
Mass media people from Bordeaux
French gay writers